Ville Topias Pulkki (born May 10, 1969) is a Finnish acoustics researcher and professor at Aalto University 2015–.  

Pulkki has received funding for his research from, for example, European Research Council (ERC), Fraunhofer institut and Academy of Finland.  Pulkki is a fellow member of the Audio Engineering Society.  In 2014, Pulkki was awarded the Samuel L. Warner Memorial Medal for his significant research work surround and multichannel audio. 

Pulkki was appointed docent of spatial sound at Aalto University in 2007–2012, an assistant professor in 2012–2015 and a professor in 2015. 

Pulkki has co-authored Communication Acoustics with Matti Karjalainen textbook Communication Acoustics: An Introduction to Speech, Audio and Psychoacoustics (2015), published by John Wiley & Sons.

Awards and honors 
 Audio Engineering Society Fellow (2010) 
 Samuel L. Warner Memorial Medal (2014). Society of Motion Picture and Television Engineers (SMPTE) The award is given of outstanding contributions in the field of spatial sound reproduction and multi-channel audio rendering 
 AES Silver Medal (2017) Exceptional contributions in the understanding and development of spatial audio techniques

Education 
Pulkki studied at the Helsinki University of Technology, where he obtained a Master of Science in Technology in 1994, and a Doctor of Science in Technology in 2001.

Thesis publications

Selected works

References

External links 
 

1969 births
People from Jyväskylä
Finnish inventors
Academic staff of Aalto University
Living people